Gospel Train is a studio album by gospel and R&B artist Sister Rosetta Tharpe, recorded in July 1956 and released in December the same year. Tharpe is accompanied on vocals by the  traditional black gospel quartet the Harmonizing Four on some of the songs. The album was noted as part of Tharpe's induction to the Rock and Roll Hall of Fame.

Music
Sister Rosetta Tharpe was already known as one of gospel's most successful and pioneering artists and a leading purveyor of the genre's blending with R&B as a precursor to rock and roll. This album finds her accompanied by musicians from the New York jazz scene. The record marks a stylistic change in her recording career, presaging her influence on blues and blues rock artists of the 1960s.

Reception

A contemporary review in Billboard quotes the Methodist minister John Wesley: "'Why should the devil have all the good tunes?'"; the reviewer commenting that "Sister Tharpe shows that he hasn't, and she does this with her well-known rocking rhythm and zest". The album was noted as part of Tharpe's induction to the Rock and Roll Hall of Fame. Author and critic Tom Moon cited the record as a choice of the catalog in 1,000 Recordings to Hear Before You Die. The website AllMusic called it "a super collection", noting it as an album highlight of the singer's career. Premier Guitar described the guitar work in the album as exhibiting "more technique and less raunch", concluding the record is "worth it just for the swinging, twangy and so ambient and vibey '99½ Won't Do'."

Track listing
All tracks composed by Rosetta Tharpe except where noted.

"Jericho" – 2:00 (Traditional)
"When they Ring the Golden Bell" – 2:27
"Two Little Fishes, Five Loaves of Bread" – 2:31 (Bernie Hanighen)
"Beams of Heaven" – 3:20
"Can't No Grave Hold my Body Down" – 2:40
"All Alone" – 2:35
"Up Above my Head there's Music in the Air" – 2:21
"I Shall Know Him" – 2:22
"Fly Away" – 2:25
"How about You" – 2:25
"Precious Memories" – 2:36
"99½ Won't Do" – 2:02

Personnel

Musicians
 Sister Rosetta Tharpe – vocals, guitar
 George Duvivier – bass (tracks 1, 2, 7, 8, 9)
 Lloyd Trotman – bass (tracks 3 – 6, 10, 11, 12)
 Panama Francis – drums
 Ernest Richardson – guitar
 Harry 'Doc' Bagby – organ
 Ernie Hayes – piano
 The Harmonizing Four – vocals

References

Bibliography 
 
 

1956 albums
Sister Rosetta Tharpe albums
Mercury Records albums